John Smith House may refer to:

England
 John Smith House (Southwark), London, former headquarters of the British Labour Party

Scotland
 John Smith House, Glasgow, headquarters of the Scottish Labour Party

United States
 John W. Smith House, Rochester, Indiana, listed on the NRHP in Fulton County, Indiana
 John Smith House (Le Claire, Iowa), NRHP-listed
 Raccoon John Smith House, Owensboro, Kentucky, NRHP-listed in Bath County, Kentucky
 John Mace Smith House, Fall River, Massachusetts, NRHP-listed
 John Smith House (Mahwah, New Jersey), listed on the NRHP in Bergen County, New Jersey
 John Smith House (Washington Valley, New Jersey), listed on the NRHP in Morris County, New Jersey
 John Smith House (Kingston, New York), NRHP-listed, in Ulster County
 John T. Smith House, Newberg, Oregon, listed on the NRHP in Yamhill County, Oregon
John Sterling Smith Jr. House, Chappell Hill, Texas, listed on the NRHP in Washington County, Texas
 John Smith House (Clinton, Wisconsin), listed on the NRHP in Rock County, Wisconsin
 John Y. and Emerette C. Smith House, Lehi, Utah, listed on the NRHP in Utah County, Utah

See also
Smith House (disambiguation)